Jordan-Claire Green (born October 31, 1991) is an American actress. She is most well known for her role as Michelle in the film School of Rock. Ten years after the film's release, the cast, together with Jack Black, gathered in Austin, Texas, where they greeted fans on a red carpet, took part in a public re-screening of the film followed by a Q&A, after which they reunited on stage for a live music performance.

Background 

Green was born in Terceira Island, Azores, Portugal. She has taken violin lessons since age 4. She now takes piano and voice lessons as well as dance classes, including tap, ballet, jazz and hip-hop. She appeared in School of Rock as Michelle, a student turned groupie. She was age 14 when she starred as Annie Lamm in Come Away Home for which she received a Young Artist Award nomination for 'Best Performance – Leading Young Actress', The Double, The 12 Dogs of Christmas, and Forgotten Pills. She also guest-starred in Power Rangers Time Force, Alias and Arrested Development.

Filmography 
 Power Rangers Time Force (1 episode, 2001) as Holly Zaskin
 City Guys (1 episode, 2001) as Elle
 School of Rock (2003) as Michelle
 Arrested Development (1 episode, 2004) as Supervisor's Daughter
 Come Away Home (2005) as Annie Lamm
 The Double (2005) as Stephanie
 The 12 Dogs of Christmas (2005) as Emma O'Conner
 Alias (1 episode, 2005) as Nicole Gibson
 Boys Life (2006) as Debbie
 Girlfriends (1 episode, 2007) as Kelly
 Wizards of Waverly Place (1 episode, 2007) as Kelly
 Wild About Harry (2009) as Bridget Howard
 Forgotten Pills (2010) as Megan 15

Awards

References

External links 
 

1991 births
Living people
American child actresses
American film actresses
American television actresses
People from Terceira Island
Portuguese emigrants to the United States
21st-century American women